Edmund Maduabebe Daukoru (born 13 October 1943) is a former Nigerian Minister of State for Energy and was Secretary General of the Organization of the Petroleum Exporting Countries (OPEC) in 2006. He became the Amayanabo, or traditional ruler, of Nembe Kingdom in 2008. Also Chairman of South South Monarchs forum in the PGEJ regime.

Background
Daukoru was born on 13 October 1943 in the oil-rich Bayelsa State.
He obtained a Ph.D in Geology from Imperial College, London.  He was employed by Shell International Petroleum Company from 1970, where he rose from Chief Geologist to General Manager of Exploration in Nigeria.
In 1992, he became Group Managing Director of the Nigerian National Petroleum Corporation.

Political career
In 2003, Daukoru became Presidential Advisor on Petroleum and Energy, and in July 2005 was appointed Minister of State for Energy in the cabinet of President Olusegun Obasanjo.
He was appointed Secretary General of OPEC on 1 January 2006 for a one-year term.

Traditional ruler

Daukoru was appointed the Amayanabo, or traditional ruler of Nembe Kingdom in Bayelsa state, taking the name Mingi XIII.
Rivalries between the Bassambiri and Ogbolomabiri communities of the old Nembe Kingdom date back over 200 years.
In April 2010 the Bayelsa State government attempted once more to resolve these issues, bringing together Daukoru with Ralph Iwowari, Amanyanabo of Nembe Bassambiri, and other chiefs to find a solution.
After the meeting both kings said they were optimistic that the differences between the two feuding communities could be resolved.
In August 2010 Daukoru's palace was attacked by armed youths in speedboats who tied up the guards, stole the traditional regalia and destroyed the palace.

References

Living people
Energy ministers of Nigeria
1943 births
Kings of Nembe
Secretaries General of OPEC
People from Bayelsa State
Alumni of Imperial College London